The 1905–06 Dartmouth Big Green men's basketball team represented Dartmouth College in intercollegiate basketball during the 1905–06 season. The team finished the season with a 16–2 record and were named national champions by the Helms Athletic Foundation.  Player George Grebenstein was named a consensus All-American as well as the national player of the year at the end of the season.

Schedule

|-
!colspan=9| Regular season

Source

References

Dartmouth Big Green men's basketball seasons
Dartmouth
NCAA Division I men's basketball tournament championship seasons
Dartmouth Big Green Men's Basketball Team
Dartmouth Big Green Men's Basketball Team